Punjab State Highway 12A, commonly referred to as SH 12A, is a state highway in the state of Punjab in India. The route of this state highway is from Mohali to Bhikhi in the state of Punjab. The total length of the highway is 142 kilometres.

Route description
The route of the highway is Mohali-Landran-Chunni Kalan-Fatehgarh Sahib-Sirhind-Mandi Gobindgarh-Bhadson-Nabha-Bhawanigarh-Sunam-Bhikhi

Major junctions

  National Highway 205A in Landran
 Major District Road 53 (Punjab MDR 31) in Fatehgarh Sahib
  National Highway 44 in Sirhind and Mandi Gobindgarh
 Major District Road 32 (Punjab MDR 32) in Nabha
  National Highway 7 in Bhawanigarh
  National Highway 52 in Mahlan
  National Highway 148BB in Sunam
  National Highway 148B in Bhikhi

See also
List of state highways in Punjab, India

References

State Highways in Punjab, India